The 2000 South American Rugby Championship was the 22nd edition of the competition of the leading national Rugby Union teams in South America.

The tournament was played in Montevideo, with three team participating. Paraguay withdrew.

Argentina (that played with the "Development XV") won the tournament.

Standings 

 Three point for victory, two for draw, and one for lost 
{| class="wikitable"
|-
!width=165|Team
!width=40|Played
!width=40|Won
!width=40|Drawn
!width=40|Lost
!width=40|For
!width=40|Against
!width=40|Difference
!width=40|Pts
|- bgcolor=#ccffcc align=center
|align=left| 
|2||2||0||0||47||35||+ 12||6
|- align=center
|align=left| 
|2||1||0||1||30||38||- 8||4
|- align=center
|align=left| 
|2||0||0||2||25||29||- 4||2
|}

Results

References

 IRB – South American Championship 2000

2000
2000 rugby union tournaments for national teams
2000 in Argentine rugby union
rugby union
rugby union
A
International rugby union competitions hosted by Uruguay